Dhopapara is a village in Puthia Upazila, Bangladesh. In the village are one college, Dhopapara Memorial Degree College, and two high schools: Dhopapara High School and Dhopapara Girls High School.
This is a big village and it has a big market.

References

Rajshahi District
Populated places in Rajshahi District